Beach Road may refer to:
Beach Road, Melbourne, Australia
Beach Road, Perth, Australia
Beach Road, Visakhapatnam, India
Beach Road, Singapore

See also 
 Beach Street (disambiguation)